Otholobium nitens is an upright, densely branched shrub of up to  high that is assigned to the Pea family. It has one to many initially softly hairy stems, alternately set, clover-like, upright leaves crowding the new shoots, and heads consisting of 3 pea-like, dark purple to mauve flowers on short peduncles in the axils of the leaves on short side-shoots. This species is an endemic of the mountains between Ceres and Hottentots Holland in the Western Cape province of South Africa. It mostly flowers between October and late December.

Taxonomy 
Specimens of the species have been collected for science since 1950. In 2017, Charles Stirton and A. Muthama Muasya considered it sufficiently different from its relatives, in particular O. mundianum, described it, and called it Otholobium nitens. The name of the genus Otholobium is compounded from the Greek words ὠθέω (ōthéō) meaning to push and λοβός (lobos) meaning pod, which Stirton selected because its fruit seems to be pushed out of the calyx. The specific epithet (nitens) is a Latin word meaning "shining", referring to the shiny felty hairs that adorn the young stems of this species.

Description 
From the ground emerge one to many shiny silky, softly hairy stems with the nodes close to each other. The leaflets are narrowly inverted egg-shaped to inverted egg-shaped, have a wedge-shaped base, a margin with very fine rounded teeth, the midrib extending beyond the leaflet blade into a hooked point. Plants in the Hottentots Holland Mountains have relatively wide leaflets. The leaf surface is shiny, and has many, both sunken and raised, somewhat translucent glands that turn reddish brown or blackish when dry. Young leaflets are hairless except for prominent adpressed silky hairs along the midrib and margins.

The calyx is hairless except for black hairs pressed along the veins and margins. As in most Faboideae, the corolla is zygomorphic, forms a specialized structure and consists of 5 free petals. The wing blades are adorned with up to 20 ridges and swollen tips. At the tip the ovary extends into a forward sloping style that is thickened at the place where it curves upwards about 1.5 mm from its end. The pistil it topped by a small stigma with brush-like hairs.

Differences with related species 
Otholobium nitens differs from O. mundianum by the characteristically numerous and
variously-sized leaf glands, drying black (not sparse, more or less evenly sized glands that dry reddish orange), narrower, 3–3.5 (–11) mm wide leaflets (not 7–11 mm wide), mauve or bluish purple standard with deep purple nectar guide (not white standard with green nectar guide), the lowest tooth of the calyx with black hairs and 3 times wider than the other teeth (not white-haired and twice as wide other), and the wing petals twice as long as the keel petals (not wing petals only one third longer than keel petals).

Conservation, distribution and ecology 
Otholobium nitens is a rare species. It is restricted to the high mountains in the South Western Cape between the Kogelberg area and Ceres, where it does not face any threats. This species resprouts from an underground rootstock after a fire destroyed the above ground biomass. It produces only a few seeds.

References 

Otholobium nitens
Endemic flora of South Africa
Plants described in 2017